Czech Republic competed at the 2018 Winter Olympics in Pyeongchang, South Korea, from 9 to 25 February 2018, with 93 competitors in 13 sports. They won seven medals in total: two gold, two silver and three bronze, ranking 14th in the medal table.

Medalists

Competitors 
The following is the list of number of competitors participating at the Games per sport/discipline.

Alpine skiing

Czech Republic has qualified 5 men and 4 women.

Men

Women

Mixed

Biathlon 

Based on their Nations Cup rankings in the 2016–17 Biathlon World Cup, the Czech Republic has qualified a team of 5 men and 6 women.

Men

Women

Mixed

Bobsleigh 

Based on their rankings in the 2017–18 Bobsleigh World Cup, the Czech Republic has qualified 4 sleds.

* – Denotes the driver of each sled

Cross-country skiing

Czech Republic has qualified 5 men and 5 women.

Distance
Men

Women

Sprint

Figure skating 

The Czech Republic has qualified one male figure skater, based on its placement at the 2017 World Figure Skating Championships in Helsinki, Finland.  They additionally qualified one entry in ice dance as well as an entry in pairs skating through the 2017 CS Nebelhorn Trophy. The team was announced on October 7 2017.

Freestyle skiing 

Ski cross

Ice hockey 

Summary

Men's tournament

Czech Republic men's national ice hockey team qualified by finishing as one of the top eight teams in the 2015 IIHF World Ranking.

Team roster

Preliminary round

Quarterfinal

Semifinal

Bronze medal game

Luge 

Based on the results from the World Cups during the 2017–18 Luge World Cup season, the Czech Republic qualified 4 sleds.

Mixed team relay

Nordic combined 

Czech Republic qualified 4 athletes:

Short track speed skating 

The Czech Republic qualified one skater for women's 1500 m events for the Olympics during the four World Cup events in November 2017.

Ski jumping 

Czech Republic qualified 5 male ski jumpers:

Snowboarding 

Freestyle

Parallel

Snowboard cross

Speed skating

The Czech Republic earned the following quotas at the conclusion of the four World Cup's used for qualification.

Individual

Mass start

References

Nations at the 2018 Winter Olympics
2018
Winter Olympics